Belle Starr is a 1941 American Western film directed by Irving Cummings and starring 
Randolph Scott, Gene Tierney, Dana Andrews, and Shepperd Strudwick. Written by Lamar Trotti and based on a story by Niven Busch and Cameron Rogers, it was produced by Kenneth Macgowan for 20th Century Fox, and shot in Technicolor.

The film is very loosely based on the life of 19th-century American outlaw Belle Starr. It was the fourth film and the third sound film to portray Starr on the screen, but it was the first major Hollywood production to do so. Its success led to many more such portrayals, although the real Starr was fairly obscure during her lifetime.

Plot
Shortly after the Civil War, Belle Shirley hides the guerrilla leader Sam Starr, whose discovery and capture  leads to the burning of the family mansion by Yankee soldiers. Vowing revenge, Belle breaks Sam and her brother out of jail and joins his band for a series of raids on banks, railroads, carpetbaggers, and enemy troops. Belle's bravado during the attacks earns her a reputation among the locals, as well as the love of Starr himself. The pair get married, but when Sam Starr lets a couple of psychotic outlaws into the gang, Belle wonders if he really cares about the Confederate cause and her doubts deepen when her brother visits and is shot down. She decides to surrender in hope that Sam will follow her, but learning of an ambush is shot by a bounty hunter as she returns to give warning. Sam and the Union commander collude in not identifying her body, allowing her to live on in legend.

Cast
 Randolph Scott as Sam Starr
 Gene Tierney as Belle Shirley /  Belle Starr
 Dana Andrews as Maj. Thomas Crail
 John Shepperd as Ed Shirley
 Elizabeth Patterson as Sarah
 Chill Wills as Blue Duck
 Louise Beavers as Mammy Lou
 Olin Howland as Jasper Trench
 Paul Burns as Sergeant
 Joseph Sawyer as John Cole
 Joseph Downing as Jim Cole
 Howard C. Hickman as Col. Thornton
 Charles Trowbridge as Col. Bright
 James Flavin as Sergeant
 Charles Middleton as Carpetbagger

See also
 Belle Starr's Daughter - 1948 American Western film

References

External links
 
 
 
 

1941 films
1941 Western (genre) films
1940s biographical films
20th Century Fox films
American Civil War films
American Western (genre) films
Biographical films about people of the American Old West
Cultural depictions of Belle Starr
1940s English-language films
Films directed by Irving Cummings
Films scored by Alfred Newman
Films with screenplays by Lamar Trotti
1940s American films